In the United States, an employer matching program is an employer's potential payment to their 401(k) plan that depends on participating employees' contribution to the plan.

Background

An employee's 401(k) plan is a retirement savings plan. The option of an employer matching program varies from company to company. It is not mandatory for a company to offer a contribution to their 401(k) plans. Contributions may benefit the company in various ways: as an employee benefit to attract and retain employees, as a business tax deduction, or as a safe harbor contribution to automatically pass certain annual testing of the plan required by the IRS and Department of Labor or to fulfill the plan's top-heavy provisions.

Many companies add to an employee's charity contribution. Through a corporate matching gift program, a company can double or even triple an employee's contribution toward a charity. This should not be confused with an employer matching program.

"100% of the first 6%"
As of 2013, the most common matching program increased to 100% of the first 6%.
This program states that once the employee contributes 6% of their gross pay, the employer's contributions stop until the following year. If the employee contributes less than 6% of their gross income, the employee foregoes additional compensation from the employer available to them had they contributed up to the 6% limit. For example, an employee whose annual gross pay is $50,000 contributes $3,000 (6% of gross pay) would receive a $3,000 employer contribution. If the employee contributed more than $3,000 the employee would not receive additional employer contributions. If the employee only contributed $2,000 (4% of gross pay), they would only receive a $2,000 employer contribution leaving $1,000 of potential employer contribution on the table.

Functions

In a 401(k) plan, the contributions are funded by the employee and are often matched by contributions from the employer. The contributions to an employee's 401(k) plan account are made from the employee's salary before taxes (or in the case of Roth deferrals, after taxes). These funds grow tax-free until the employee can withdraw them; depending on the reason for withdrawal, the employee may be able to roll contributions and any investment gains into an Individual Retirement Account (IRA), where they continue to grow tax-free except for any required minimum distributions from the IRA to the account holder. The funds may also be switched if one changes employers. An employer's matching program is situational and depends on if a workplace offers one. According to the Profit Sharing/401k Council of America, an industry trade group, about 78% of 401(k) plans include some kind of employer match for employee contributions.

In an employer matching program, an employee will typically only receive a contribution from an employer if an employee makes a contribution of their own (e.g., an employer will only match contributions if the employee makes some contribution). Employer matches vary from company to company. The general contribution from an employer is usually 3% to 6% of an employee's pay.

For employees to receive a contribution from their employer, the employee must contribute a specified percentage into a 401(k) plan. The employer will then match that contribution to the retirement plan being offered. The money that is put into the retirement plan is free. Investing in a 401(k) plan is a great way to increase retirement savings and increase the money earned.

In a traditional retirement account, the amount one contributes is taken before taxes. On the other hand, a Roth retirement account allows employees to contribute after taxes, with the benefits being withdrawn tax-free in retirement. Usually, employers will specify a vesting period, which is the minimum amount of time an employee must work to claim the employer-matched contributions.

Regardless of how or when an employee stops employment, the money that an employee invests in their 401(k) plan is retained by the employee. The contributions made by an employer may or may not be retained based on the vesting program. To understand this better, a vested employee is one that has worked in a company for a specified amount of time. The employer determines the length of time required to become vested; this is usually a one- to five-year span. A vested employee then becomes eligible to retain all retirement contributions made by an employer. After an employee is fully vested, the employee is eligible to retain the entire amount contributed by their employer, even if they leave the company before retirement. Under federal law an employer can take back all or part of the matching money they put into an employee's account if the worker fails to stay on the job for the vesting period.

Employer matching programs would not exist without 401(k) plans. The Revenue Act of 1978 included a provision that became Internal Revenue Code. Under this act the employees are not taxed on the portion of income they agree to receive as deferred compensation rather than direct cash payment. A  401(k) plan is a long-term money management plan.

Nearly two-thirds of plans provide employer matching contributions today. Most common is a dollar-for-dollar up to a specific agreed percentage of pay which is commonly up to 6% of yearly income. The employer matching program is any potential additional payment to an employee's 401(k) plan. The employer is not responsible to contribute any specific amount to the employee; each agreement is situational according to the workplace. Since the start of a credit crisis and the 2008 recession, companies are either stopping matching programs or making the match available to employees based on whether or not the company makes money. In this stage of the economy, with many companies rethinking matching programs. If an employee is lucky enough to establish an employer contribution toward their 401(k) plan, this employer match (or free money) is the biggest benefit of a 401(k) plan given that the future of the economy is unpredictable.

Cons of 401(k) plan
 The lack of diversity in investment choices offered by many 401(k) providers
 lack of security of employee's contributions
 high expenses due to the expenses built into a 401(k) plan

These are all concerning issues in a 401(k) plan. Lawmakers failed to structure laws around financial institutions that support them, so that the 401(k) is a secure retirement.

Pros of 401(k) plan and employer matching program
The employer matching program and the tax deduction are great advantages to a 401(k) plan; these two alone keep many employees invested. Economically 401(k) plans are good because it incentivizes Americans to invest in anything they want and build their wealth with certain tax breaks.

For the year 2022 for 401(k) plans the contribution limit is $20,500. If an employee reached the age of 50 by the end of the calendar year, they could save an additional $6,500, for a total savings of $27,000.

References

Retirement in the United States
Employers